Daneshgah-e Emam Ali Metro Station, which is translated into Imam Ali University Metro Station is a station in Tehran Metro Line 2. It is located in Imam Khomeini Street in front of the old Majles building near Imam Ali University. It is between Imam Khomeini Metro Station and Hor Square Metro Station. The station is named after Imam Ali University for Army Officers, which is located near the station on Imam Khomeini Street. The Assembly of Experts' building is also located next to this station.

References

Tehran Metro stations